Eusebi Güell i Bacigalupi, 1st Count of Güell (15 December 1846 – 8 July 1918) was a Catalan entrepreneur who profited greatly from the industrial revolution in Catalonia in the late 19th century. He married Luisa Isabel Lopez y Bru, daughter of Antonio López y López, 1st Marquis of Comillas and notorious slave trader, in 1871, and the couple had ten children. One of Güell's daughters, Isabel Güell i López, became a noted composer.

Biography
Güell was born in Barcelona and was the son of Joan Güell i Ferrer, a wealthy industrialist from Torredembarra who had amassed considerable riches during his stay in Cuba as a slave trader and thanks to the numerous activities established at his return in Barcelona. His mother, Francesca Bacigalupi I Dolcer, was a member of an ancient merchant family from Genoa who had moved to Catalonia in the late 18th century.

Güell took over his father's business, which was predominantly in textiles, and added to the family's wealth. After his wedding, he became one of Spain’s wealthiest men. 

Güell met the young architect, Antoni Gaudi, following a visit to the World Fair held in Paris in 1878, where he had seen Gaudi's work at the Spanish Pavilion. The pair become lifelong friends and associates and found that they had mutual interests, including religion (both were devout Catholics).  Güell became a 'Mediciesque' patron to architect Antoni Gaudí. Their many collaborations began at the start of Gaudi's career, when Güell saw Gaudí as the man who could provide him with uniquely designed buildings.

Among Güell's early commissions for the aspiring architect were the Bodega Güell (winery) at Garraf, the Pabellones Güell de Pedralbes and Park Güell which was originally the Güell family home and only later bequeathed to the state.

In 1890, Güell moved his textile factory from Sants to Santa Coloma de Cervello, south of Barcelona. There he established a worker's colony along the lines of the British worker's colonies which had been built in the late nineteenth century. The colony or village at Santa Coloma, now known as Colonia Güell, was built with high socialist ideals; homes with larger than average rooms, wide windows and good ventilation so that the textile workers and their families could enjoy comfortable living conditions. The village was to be relatively self-contained and included shops, cafes, a theatre, library and a school (only for boys). In 1890, Gaudi was commissioned to build a church and crypt on the hill overlooking the village. However, Güell ran into financial difficulties and the project was eventually abandoned. In spite of its unfinished status, the work is a masterpiece and demonstrates many of Gaudi's signature architectural devices including catenary arches and tessellated finishes. The village, which is still fully operational boasts many fine examples of modernist architecture.

Reportedly on one occasion Gaudí said to Güell, "Sometimes I think we are the only people who like this architecture." Güell replied, "I don't like your architecture, I respect it."

in 1900, Güell bought land in Gracia, Barcelona and employed Gaudí to build an estate for the rich. At that time, the area was considered to be remote and the project failed to realize commercial success. Only two houses were built. In 1923, the Güell family gave the land to the city, as Park Güell.

King Alfonso XIII ennobled Eusebi Güell as count in 1908. He died in his house in Park Güell in 1918.

Patronage
Buildings by Gaudí that bear Güell's name include:
Palau Güell
Colònia Güell (at Santa Coloma de Cervello)
Park Güell
Bodega Güell (at Garraf, near Sitges)
Pabellones Güell de Pedrables

References

External links
Page at Catalan Encyclopedia online 

1846 births
1918 deaths
People from Barcelona
Catalan nobility
Businesspeople from Catalonia
Burials at Poblenou Cemetery